Arne Johan Andersen (21 April 1900 – 26 October 1986) was a Norwegian football player for the club FK Kvik, and police officer. He was born in Halden. He played with the Norwegian national team at the Antwerp Olympics in 1920, where the Norwegian team reached the quarter finals. He was capped six times for Norway, scoring four goals. During occupation of Norway by Nazi Germany, he was arrested on 15 September 1944, and incarcerated at the Grini concentration camp from October 1944. He died in Halden in 1986.

References

External links 
 

1900 births
1986 deaths
People from Halden
Norwegian footballers
Kvik Halden FK players
Norway international footballers
Footballers at the 1920 Summer Olympics
Olympic footballers of Norway
Grini concentration camp survivors
Association football forwards
Sportspeople from Viken (county)